Captain William Henry O'Shea (1840 – 22 April 1905) was an Irish soldier and Member of Parliament.  He is best known for being the ex-husband of Katharine O'Shea, the long-time mistress of the Irish nationalist leader Charles Stewart Parnell.

Life
Born in Dublin, O'Shea was a captain in the 18th Hussars of the British Army.

Around 1880, his wife, Essex born Katharine O'Shea, entered into a relationship with the Irish nationalist leader Charles Stewart Parnell, with whom she had three children. O'Shea, who was already separated from his wife, knew of the relationship.

In 1882 when the Liberal Government was secretly negotiating with Parnell for the terms of his release from Kilmainham prison where he was being held on suspicion of "treasonable practices", the President of the Board of Trade Joseph Chamberlain chose O’Shea as its intermediary, unaware of Parnell's affair with Mrs O’Shea or of the fact that the newly born first child of their liaison was dying.  O’Shea spent 6 hours negotiating with Parnell in the prison, extracting the surprising concession that Parnell would tacitly support the Government after his release.  It has been suggested that O’Shea won this concession, which reflected well on him, by threatening Parnell with public exposure of his affair with Mrs O’Shea.

In 1886, following insinuations of the Parnell affair and O'Shea's complicity in it appearing in the Pall Mall Gazette, O'Shea abstained from voting on the Irish Home Rule bill and resigned his parliamentary seat the following day.  However, he only filed for divorce on 24 December 1889 after his wife's aunt, from whom he was expecting a large inheritance, died earlier that year leaving her estate in trust for his wife (thus allegedly violating the terms of O'Shea's marriage contract).  However, that will was overturned upon appeal, and the aunt's legacy was shared among Katharine O'Shea's siblings.

After the divorce the two surviving children of Parnell and Katharine O'Shea were given into Captain O'Shea's custody.

O'Shea was MP for Clare from 1880 to 1885 and Galway Borough for a short period in 1886. Although supported by Parnell, he was never a member of the Irish Parliamentary Party.

References

External links 

1840 births
1905 deaths
18th Royal Hussars officers
19th-century Irish people
Members of the Parliament of the United Kingdom for County Clare constituencies (1801–1922)
Members of the Parliament of the United Kingdom for County Galway constituencies (1801–1922)
UK MPs 1880–1885
UK MPs 1885–1886